Chroococcaceae is a family of cyanobacteria.

References

Cyanobacteria families
Chroococcales